Cerotainia is a genus of robber flies in the family Asilidae. There are at least 30 described species in Cerotainia.

Species
These 32 species belong to the genus Cerotainia:

 Cerotainia albipilosa Curran, 1930 i c g b
 Cerotainia argyropasta Hermann, 1912 c g
 Cerotainia argyropus Schiner, 1868
 Cerotainia argyropyga Hermann, 1912 c g
 Cerotainia atrata Jones, 1907 i c g
 Cerotainia aurata Schiner, 1868
 Cerotainia bella Schiner, 1867 c g
 Cerotainia brasiliensis Schiner, 1867 c g
 Cerotainia camposi Curran, 1934 c g
 Cerotainia dasythrix Hermann, 1912 c g
 Cerotainia debilis Hermann, 1912 c g
 Cerotainia dubia Bigot, 1878 c g
 Cerotainia feminea Curran, 1930 c g
 Cerotainia flavipes Hermann, 1912 c g
 Cerotainia jamaicensis Johnson, 1919 c g
 Cerotainia laticeps Bromley, 1929 c g
 Cerotainia leonina Hermann, 1912 c g
 Cerotainia macrocera (Say, 1823) i c g b
 Cerotainia marginata Hermann, 1912 c g
 Cerotainia melanosoma Scarbrough & Knutson, 1989 c g
 Cerotainia minima Curran, 1930 c g
 Cerotainia nigra Bigot, 1878 c g
 Cerotainia nigripennis (Bellardi, 1861) c g
 Cerotainia ornatipes James, 1953 c g
 Cerotainia propinqua Schiner, 1868
 Cerotainia rhopalocera (Lynch Arribalzaga, 1882) c g
 Cerotainia sarae Rueda, 1998 c g
 Cerotainia sola Scarbrough & Perez-Gelabert, 2006 c g
 Cerotainia unicolor Hermann, 1912 c g
 Cerotainia violaceithorax Lynch Arribalzaga, 1880 c g
 Cerotainia willistoni Curran, 1930 c g
 Cerotainia xanthoptera (Wiedemann, 1828) c

Data sources: i = ITIS, c = Catalogue of Life, g = GBIF, b = Bugguide.net

References

Further reading

External links

 

 
Asilidae genera
Articles created by Qbugbot